United Nations Security Council Resolution 1942, adopted unanimously on September 29, 2010, after recalling Resolution 1933 (2010) on the situation in Côte d'Ivoire (Ivory Coast), the Council increased the military and police contingents of the United Nations Operation in Côte d'Ivoire (UNOCI).

The Security Council recalled its decision to consider temporarily raising the limit on the number of military and police personnel before and after the elections to a total of no more than 500 additional personnel. The Secretary-General Ban Ki-moon had recommended an increase from 8,650 to 9,150, and that a final voters list was agreed by Ivorian parties on September 6, 2010.

Acting under Chapter VII of the United Nations Charter, the Council authorised an increase of UNOCI military and police personnel by 500, from 8,650 to 9,150, for an immediate deployment for a period of up to six months.

See also
 Ivorian Civil War
 Ivorian parliamentary election, 2010
 Ivorian presidential election, 2010
 List of United Nations Security Council Resolutions 1901 to 2000 (2009–2011)

References

External links
 
Text of the Resolution at undocs.org

 1942
2010 in Ivory Coast
 1942
September 2010 events